Kozhinjampara may refer to:

 Kozhinjampara, a village in Palakkad district, state of Kerala, India
 Kozhinjampara (gram panchayat), a gram panchayat that serves the above and other villages